FBD may refer to:

Science and technology 
 Flange back distance
 Free body diagram
 Fully Buffered DIMM
 Function block diagram, a graphical language for programmable logic controller design
 Functional block diagram, a block diagram in systems engineering

Transport 
 Braine-l'Alleud railway station, in Belgium
 Flemington Bridge railway station, in England
 Farrukhabad Junction railway station, in Uttar Pradesh, India
 Fayzabad Airport, in Afghanistan

Other uses 
 Far Beyond Driven, an album by American metal band Pantera
 FBD Holdings, an Irish insurance company
 Freshfields Bruckhaus Deringer, a British law firm